Agrilus putillus is a species of metallic wood-boring beetle in the family Buprestidae. It is found in Canada, North America.

Subspecies
These two subspecies belong to the species Agrilus putillus:
 Agrilus putillus parputillus Knull, 1960
 Agrilus putillus putillus Say, 1833

References

Further reading

 
 
 

putillus
Beetles of North America
Taxa named by Thomas Say
Beetles described in 1833
Articles created by Qbugbot